Pagodidaphne schepmani is a species of sea snail, a marine gastropod mollusk in the family Raphitomidae.

The specific name schepmani is in honor of Dutch malacologist Mattheus Marinus Schepman.

Description

Distribution
This marine species occurs off East Africa.

References

External links
  Thiele J., 1925. Gastropoden der Deutschen Tiefsee-Expedition. In:. Wissenschaftliche Ergebnisse der Deutschen Tiefsee-Expedition auf dem Dampfer "Valdivia" 1898–1899  II. Teil, vol. 17, No. 2, Gustav Fischer, Berlin
 

schepmani
Gastropods described in 1925